In European heraldry, the decapitated Turk head (Czech and ,), most often as pierced by a sword, signifies the many wars fought by European Christian states against the invading Muslim, Turkish-led Ottoman Empire. Other depictions include the head held up by a victor or picked by a raven. It is used in modern town, municipality and village coat of arms in Hungary, Serbia and Croatia.

List

Cities and towns
Hungary: Bezeréd, Derecske, Komádi, Gáborján, Hajdúdorog, Hajdúnánás, Szécsény, Tépe
Serbia: Kikinda, Vršac
Croatia: Đelekovec

Families

It was adopted by some Austro-Hungarian nobility, such as:

The Balogh of Nemčice (in Slovakia), Mezőcsávás (in Romania), Csegö (?), Szász-Czegö (?)
The Schwarzenberg of Český Krumlov (in Bohemia)
The Baky
The Benkeö of Kezdi-Sarfalva
The Csernovics
The Csernoevicz
The Csokits
The Dunca of Sajo
The Eperjessy of Gyulafehérvár (in Romania)
The Kajdachy
The Karácson
The Kovács
The Kruchió
The Latinovics
The Nagy
The Okolicsányi
The Pótsa

Gallery

See also

Heads in heraldry
Moor's head (heraldry)
Ottoman wars in Europe

References

Further reading

Trophy heads
Serbian heraldry